Reginald Robotham (14 July 1911 – 31 January 1978) was an English cricketer.  Robotham was a right-handed batsman who fielded as a wicket-keeper.  He was born at Bidford-on-Avon, Warwickshire.

Robotham made a single first-class cricket appearance for Sussex County Cricket Club against MCC at the Central Recreation Ground, Hastings, in 1946.  Robotham scored 21 runs before being dismissed by Tony Mallett in Sussex's first innings and 10 runs in they second  before he was dismissed by Jim Sims.

He died at Hastings, Sussex, on 31 January 1978.

References

External links

1911 births
1978 deaths
People from Stratford-on-Avon District
English cricketers
Sussex cricketers
Wicket-keepers